Lorenzo Albacete Cintrón (January 7, 1941 – October 24, 2014) was a Puerto Rican theologian, Roman Catholic priest, scientist and author. A New York Times Magazine contributor, Albacete was one of the leaders in the United States for the international Catholic movement Communion and Liberation. He was the Chairman of the Board of Advisors of Crossroads Cultural Center.

Biography
Albacete was born in San Juan, Puerto Rico and was a physicist by training. He held a degree in Space Science and Applied Physics as well as a master's degree in Sacred Theology from the Catholic University of America in Washington, D.C. Albacete wrote for Triumph Magazine in Washington, D.C. from 1969 to 1972 and taught theology in El Escorial, Spain from 1970-1972 at The Christian Commonwealth Institute. Albacete was ordained to the priesthood in 1972 for the Roman Catholic Archdiocese of Washington. He held a doctorate in Sacred Theology from the Pontifical University of St. Thomas Aquinas in Rome. He taught at the John Paul II Institute in Washington, D.C., and the St. Joseph Seminary in Yonkers, N.Y., and from 1996 to 1997 served as President of Catholic University of Puerto Rico in Ponce. He was advisor on Hispanic Affairs to the U.S. Conference of Catholic Bishops.

He was a columnist for the Italian weekly Tempi, wrote for The New Yorker, and appeared or was interviewed on CNN, The Charlie Rose Show, PBS, EWTN, Slate, The New Republic, and Godspy, where he was the theological advisor.

In 2010, Albacete's commentary was featured in the award-winning documentary film, The Human Experience.

Albacete lived in Yonkers, N.Y. He died on October 23, 2014 in Dobbs Ferry, New York. He was buried at Cementerio Porta Coeli in Bayamón, Puerto Rico.

Publications
Beside columns and articles on a number of American and international publications, Albacete was the author of God at the Ritz: Attraction to Infinity (Crossroad Publishing Company), a book in which as priest-physicist he talks about science, sex, politics, and religion.

Hendrik Hertzberg (The New Yorker) noted: "Lorenzo Albacete is one of a kind, and so is God at the Ritz. The book, like the monsignor, crackles with humor, warmth, and intellectual excitement. Reading it is like having a stay-up-all-night, jump-out-of-your-chair, have-another-double-espresso marathon conversation with one of the world's most swashbuckling talkers. Conversation, hell-this is a Papal bull session!"

Bibliography
 God at the Ritz: Attraction to Infinity.  NY: Crossroad, 2002.  .

References

External links
The Charlie Rose Show, a conversation with Reynolds Price, Gardner Taylor & Lorenzo Albacete about Jesus Christ.
PBS Interview to Lorenzo Albacete: Faith and Doubt at Ground Zero
Slate-Meaningoflife: Robert Wright interviews Lorenzo Albacete
New York Times Op-Ed: "For The Love of God"
Crossroads Cultural Center

Puerto Rican Roman Catholic priests
20th-century American Roman Catholic theologians
Catholic University of America alumni
Pontifical University of Saint Thomas Aquinas alumni
Pontifical Catholic University of Puerto Rico
Roman Catholic Archdiocese of Washington
People from Yonkers, New York
People from San Juan, Puerto Rico
Puerto Rican non-fiction writers
Religious leaders from Washington, D.C.
Writers from New York (state)
Writers from Washington, D.C.
1941 births
2014 deaths
20th-century American non-fiction writers
Catholics from New York (state)